Diploptera punctata or the Pacific beetle cockroach is a species of cockroach in the family Blaberidae and subfamily Diplopterinae. It is one of the few cockroach species that is viviparous. Adults are chemically defended, having a modified tracheal gland and spiracle on each side which squirts quinones which can poison or discourage a predator.

Life stages 
D. puntatata has 4 nymph stages, which are wingless. The adult is winged, and the adult male is smaller than the female.

Distribution
Diploptera punctata can be found in Australia, Myanmar, China, Fiji, Hawaii, and India.

Milk
Diploptera punctata produces a nutritionally dense crystalline "milk" to feed their live-born young.

The milk produced by Diploptera punctata is composed of hydrosoluble proteins and provides essential amino acids to the developing embryo such as lysine, leucine and valine.

References

Cockroaches
Insects described in 1822